The Kulunda Steppe or Kulunda Plain (Qūlyndy dalasy) is an alluvial plain in Russia and Kazakhstan. It is an important agricultural region in Western Siberia.

Geography
The Steppe is located located between the Ob and Irtysh rivers in the southern part of the West Siberian Plain, to the west of the Ob Plateau. Steppe landscapes predominate, especially in the north and east of the plain, which extends across the Altai Krai of Russia and the Pavlodar Oblast of Kazakhstan, with a small northern section in the Novosibirsk Oblast, as well as small southern part in the East Kazakhstan Oblast.

There are large lakes in the central part of the lowland, such as Lake Kuchuk, Kulunda, Bolshoye Topolnoye, Bolshoy Azhbulat and Bolshoye Yarovoye. Most of them are salty or briny. The main rivers are the Kuchuk, Kulunda and Burla. The Baraba Steppe lies to the northwest. The border between both plains is not well defined. Conventionally, it is carried out at 54 degrees north latitude.

References

Plains of Russia
Landforms of Altai Krai
Landforms of Novosibirsk Oblast
Plains of Kazakhstan
West Siberian Plain